Uzbekistan competed at the 2022 Winter Olympics in Beijing, China, from 4 to 20 February 2022.

The Uzbek team consisted of one male alpine skier.

Komiljon Tukhtaev was the country's flagbearer during the opening ceremony. Meanwhile a volunteer was the flagbearer during the closing ceremony.

Competitors
The following is the list of number of competitors participating at the Games per sport/discipline.

Alpine skiing

By meeting the basic qualification standards Uzbekistan qualified one male alpine skier.

References

Nations at the 2022 Winter Olympics
2022
Winter Olympics